The Boxing Tournament at the 1998 Central American and Caribbean Games was held in Maracaibo, Venezuela from August 13 to August 22, 1998.

Medal winners

References
Results on Amateur Boxing

C
C
C